Storyteller is the seventh studio album by Alfie Boe. It was released on 9 November 2012 in the United Kingdom by Decca Records. The album peaked at number 6 on the UK Albums Chart.

Track listing

Charts and certifications

Weekly charts

Year-end charts

Certifications

Release history

References

2012 albums
Alfie Boe albums